Zgoda Ruda Śląska is a Polish women's handball team, based in Ruda Śląska.

See also 
 Handball in Poland
 Sports in Poland

Sport in Ruda Śląska
Polish handball clubs